David Duggan may refer to:

 David Milwyn Duggan (1879–1942), politician in Alberta, Canada
 David Duggan (American football) (born 1963), American football coach and former player